Tom Gallacher (16 February 1932 – 27 October 2001) was a Scottish playwright.  He originally came from Garelochhead and went to the Hermitage Academy in Helensburgh, but in later life he lived in Alexandria in Dunbartonshire.

He was involved with the Dumbarton People's Theatre.

Plays for the stage
 Personal Effects, Pitlochry Festival Theatre, Perthshire, U.K., 1974.
 A Laughing Matter, St. Andrew's Theatre, Fife, Scotland, U.K., 1975.
 Hallowe'en, Dundee Theatre, Angus, Scotland, U.K., 1975.
 A Presbyterian Wooing (adaptor), Pitlochry Festival Theatre, 1976.
 Mr. Joyce Is Leaving Paris, King's Head, Islington, London, 1972 & 1973  
 An adaptation of Cyrano de Bergerac

Television Plays
 The Trial of Thomas Muir, 1977.
 If the Face Fits, 1978.

Radio Plays
 The Scar, 1973.

External links
about his plays
more about him

1932 births
2001 deaths
Scottish dramatists and playwrights
People from Alexandria, West Dunbartonshire
20th-century British dramatists and playwrights
People educated at Hermitage Academy